Il Boemo is a 2022 feature film about the life and career of the Czech composer Josef Mysliveček (1737–1781), directed by Petr Václav. Mysliveček was one of the most acclaimed and prolific composers of opera seria in Italy in the second half of the eighteenth century, and mentor and friend to Wolfgang Amadeus Mozart. The film stars Vojtěch Dyk, Elena Radonicich, Barbara Ronchi, and Lana Vlady. The music for the film has been recorded by the Czech ensemble Collegium 1704 led by Václav Luks, featuring international soloists such as Philippe Jaroussky, Emöke Baráth, Raffaella Milanesi, and Simona Šaturová. It was selected as the Czech entry for the Best International Feature Film at the 95th Academy Awards. It premiered at 70th San Sebastián International Film Festival on September 19, 2022.

Plot 
The son of a Prague miller, who expected him to follow in his footsteps, Mysliveček as a young man flees to Venice to realize his dream of becoming a composer. Against all odds he manages, becomes known as "Il Boemo" (i.e. "Czech"), and his success surpasses even his own expectations. During the 1770s, he is at his most prolific, composing numerous works in the genre of Italian opera seria.

Cast

Production 
The film is co-produced by the Czech Republic, Italy, and Slovakia, and was supported, among others, by the Czech Film Fund, the Italian Ministry of Culture, and the Slovak Audiovisual Fund; the producer is Jan Macola and Mimesis Film, the co-producers are Marco Alessio (Dugong Film) in Italy, Marek Urban (sentimentalfilm) in Slovakia, and Czech Television and MagicLab in the Czech Republic.

Petr Václav has singled out Stanley Kubrick’s Barry Lyndon, in relation to camera work, lighting, and narrative style, and Miloš Forman’s Amadeus, in terms of working with opera and music, as particular cinematic references.

Shooting locations 
Shooting locations in the Czech Republic included the Estates Theatre, the Martinic Palace and the Colloredo–Mansfeld Palace in Prague, the château at Jaroměřice nad Rokytnou, the Doksany Convent and the Cistercian monastery in Plasy, and the Mahen Theater in Brno.

Music 
The music for the film has been recorded by the Czech ensemble Collegium 1704, founder and conductor Václav Luks also served as musical advisor for the film. The soundtrack will be released by Warner Classics on their Erato label. Another advisor was the American musicologist Daniel E. Freeman, author of the first modern monograph on Mysliveček.

Release 
The film was selected for screening at the 70th San Sebastián International Film Festival's main competition on September 19, 2022.

See also
 List of submissions to the 95th Academy Awards for Best International Feature Film
 List of Czech submissions for the Academy Award for Best International Feature Film

References

External links 
 official website of the film
 
Il Boemo at FilmItalia

2020s Czech-language films
2020s German-language films
2020s Italian-language films
Cultural depictions of Wolfgang Amadeus Mozart
Films about classical music and musicians
Films about composers
Films set in the 1760s
Films set in the 1770s
Films set in the 1780s
Films set in Venice
Films set in Naples
Films set in Prague
Films shot in Prague
Czech historical films
Italian historical films
Slovak historical films
Italian-language Czech films
German-language Czech films
Czech multilingual films
2020s Italian films
2022 multilingual films
Czech Lion Awards winners (films)